A93 or A-93 may refer to:

 A93 road (Scotland)
 A93 motorway (Germany)
 Dutch Defence, in the Encyclopaedia of Chess Openings